Kye Beom-ju (Hangul: 계범주, born November 8, 1991), better known by the stage name Bumzu (Hangul: 범주), is a South Korean singer, songwriter, and record producer. He was a contestant on Superstar K4 and released his debut album, Something Special, on September 27, 2013. Bumzu is best known for writing and producing much of the discographies of boy bands NU'EST and Seventeen.

Discography

Studio albums

Extended plays

Singles

Collaborations

Soundtrack appearances

Production discography
All song credits are adapted from the KOMCA database.

References

External links

1991 births
Living people
Pledis Entertainment artists
21st-century South Korean  male singers
South Korean record producers
South Korean composers
Superstar K participants
Hybe Corporation artists